G. Koduru is a village in Anakapalli district of the Indian state of Andhra Pradesh.

About G.Koduru 
Makaravarampem Mandalam, Koduru, Makavarapalem, Visakhapatnam District. The distance to the monument's center is 7 km. It is situated 20 kilometers from Narsipatnam and 41 kilometers from Anakapalli.

Demographics
According to the 2011 Indian Census, the village has a population of 1904 with an area of 1,6497 inhabitants covering 1649 hectares. The number of males in the village was 3249 and the number of women was 3348. The number of Scheduled Castes was 706 while the number of Scheduled Tribes was 78. Village Census Area Code 586319. Pin Code: 531113.

No. of House Holds: 721	
Total Population: 2159	
Total Male Population: 1064
Total Female Population: 1095

Education 
The basic elementary schools in the village are five, private primary schools four, the government primary schools and one secondary government school. The nearest child is Makavarapalem. The nearest junior college, Government Arts / Science Degree College, Makavarapalem, and Engineering College Thamram. The nearest medical college and management college are in Visakhapatnam and in polytechnic nursing house. The nearest vocational training is in the school nursery and the university education center is located in Anakapalli and the rehabilitation special school Visakhapatnam.

Medical facilities

Public health facilities 
One of the primary health centers at Kodur is a doctor and two paramedical crib. There are no doctors at a primary health center. One has a paramedical staff.

Veterinary Hospital, 5 to 10 km from the village of Navaratna Are away. The nearest social health center, Mata Infant care center, T. 10 km from the B hospital Are far more than that. Alopati Hospital, Alternate Drug Hospital, Dispensary, Family Welfare Center, 10 km from the village Are far more than that.

References

Villages in Anakapalli district